Veerabhadra temple is a Hindu temple located in the Lepakshi, in the state of Andhra Pradesh, India. The temple is dedicated to the Virabhadra, a fierce incarnation of Lord Shiva. Built in the 16th century, the architectural features of the temple are in the Vijayanagara style with profusion of carvings and paintings at almost every exposed surface of the temple. It is one of the centrally protected monuments of national importance and is considered one of the most spectacular Vijayanagara temples. The fresco paintings are particularly detailed in very bright dresses and colours with scenes of Rama and Krishna from the epic stories of the Ramayana, the Mahabharata and the Puranas and they are well preserved. The temple is home to many Kannada inscriptions as its located close to Karnataka border.

Location 
The temple has been built on the southern side of Lepakshi town, on a low altitude hillock of a large exposure of granite rock, which is in the shape of a tortoise, and hence known as Kurma Saila. Another route to reach the temple is taking a route from Hindupur.

History 
The temple was built in 1530 AD (1540 AD is also mentioned) by Virupanna Nayaka and Viranna , both brothers who were Governors under the Vijayanagar Empire during the reign of King Achutaraya, at Penukonda who were native to Karnataka. The temple consists only Kannada inscriptions The cost of building the temple was defrayed by the government. According to Skanda Purana, the temple is one of the divyakshetras, an important pilgrimage site of Lord Shiva.

Architecture 

The temple is of the Vijayanagara architectural style. The main temple is laid out in three parts, these are: The assembly hall known as the Mukha mantapa or Natya mantapa or Ranga mantapa; arda mantapa or antarala (ante chamber); and the garbhagriha or the sanctum sanctorum. The temple, as an edifice, is encircled by two enclosures. The outermost walled enclosure has three gates, the northern gate is used regularly. The inner east gate is the entry to the assembly hall, which is a large sized open hall designed with a large space in its central part.

It is at the entrance to the sanctum sanctorum and has a profusion of sculptures and paintings over every inch of space on the columns and ceiling. The images on the pillars and walls are of divine beings, saints, guardians, musicians, dancers and 14 avatars of Shiva. Figurines of the goddesses Ganga and Yamuna flank the entrance to the sanctum. The exterior columns of this hall are built over a decorated plinth; the decorations are in the form of blocks of carved images of horses and soldiers. The columns are slim and have features of colonnettes carved with eaves, overhanging in a curved shape. The open space in the middle part of the hall is defined by large columns or piers which have carvings of triple figures.

In the columns in the northeastern part of the hall, there are images of Natesha flanked by Brahma and a drummer. In an adjoining column there are figurines of nymphs in dancing postures, flanked by a drummer and cymbalist. The column at the southwest part of the hall has an image of Parvathi, Shiva's consort, flanked by female attendants. There are also carvings of divinities such as Bhringi with three legs and Bhikshatana carved in a dancing posture; this is in the northwestern part of the hall. The ceiling of the hall is fully covered with mural paintings depicting the scenes from the epics, the Mahabharata, the Ramayana, and the Puranas along with the life sketches of the benefactors of the temple.

The paintings in each bay on the ceiling of the main mandapa, the antarala and other shrines, depict the grandeur of Vijayanagara pictorial art. They are painted over an initial plaster layer of lime mortar. The colour scheme consists of vegetable and mineral colours of yellow, ochre, black, blue and green blended with lime water; the background is generally painted in red colour. Apart from figures of gods and goddesses, in the presence of the devotees arranged in rows, the frescoes also depict the incarnations of Vishnu. The paintings are in striking compositions where the particular emphasis is on the period costumes and facial expressions.

The fresco in the ceiling of ardha mantapa (ante chamber), which is said to be Asia's largest, measures . It has frescoes of the 14 avatars of Lord Shiva as: Yogadakshinamurti, Chandes Anugraha Murthy, Bhikshatana, Harihara, Ardhanarishwara, Kalyanasundara, Tripurantaka, Nataraja, Gouriprasadaka, Lingodbhava, Andhakasurasmahara and so forth.

The presiding deity deified in the sanctum sanctorum is a near life-size image of Veerabhadra, fully armed and decorated with skulls. There is a cave chamber in the sanctum where sage Agasthya is said to have lived when he installed the image of the Linga here. The ceiling in the sanctum above the deity has paintings of the builders of the temple, Virupanna and Viranna, regally dressed and crowned with headgear similar to those adorning the Krishnadevaraya's bronze statue in Tirupati. They are depicted, with their entourage, in a state of reverential prayer, being offered sacred ashes of their family deity.

Within the temple complex, on the eastern wing, there is a separate chamber with Shiva and his consort Parvathi carved on a boulder. In another shrine chamber there is an image of Lord Vishnu.

Within the temple precincts, to its eastern side, there is huge boulder of granite stone which has carving of coiled multi-hooded serpent providing an umbrella cover over a Linga.

The apparently "hanging pillar" is yet another attraction in the temple. There is a gap between the base of the pillar and ground through which cloth and paper can be passed, as the pillar is slightly dislodged and touching the ground only on one side.

References

Bibliography

External links 

 Photo Essay of the Temple
 Veerabhadra Temple, Lepakshi tour information
AP Tourism Authority
Lepakshi Temple : Every Stone Has a Story to Tell - Realbharat

Shiva temples in Andhra Pradesh
Hindu temples in Anantapur district
16th-century Hindu temples
Monuments of National Importance in Andhra Pradesh
World Heritage Tentative List for India